Yannik Keitel (born 15 February 2000) is a German professional footballer who plays as a midfielder for Bundesliga club SC Freiburg. He has represented Germany internationally at several youth levels.

Club career
Keitel joined SC Freiburg in 2010 from SV Breisach. On 29 February 2020, he made his professional debut in the Bundesliga in a 1–0 league defeat away to Borussia Dortmund. He came on as a substitute at halftime for the injured Janik Haberer. In April 2020, he signed his first professional contract.

References

External links

Living people
2000 births
German footballers
Germany youth international footballers
Germany under-21 international footballers
Association football midfielders
Bundesliga players
Regionalliga players
SC Freiburg players
SC Freiburg II players
People from Breisach
Sportspeople from Freiburg (region)
Footballers from Baden-Württemberg